"No Resolution" is a song by South African rock band Seether. It was the third single from the band's fifth studio album Holding Onto Strings Better Left to Fray.

Background
The song was the first from the album to be played live, debuting on 4 September 2010. In December 2011, it was announced that the song would be released to radio on 24 January 2012. It entered the US Rock Songs chart on January 19, debuting at number 48.

Personnel
Shaun Morgan – lead vocals, rhythm guitar
Dale Stewart – bass, backing vocals
John Humphrey – drums
Troy McLawhorn – lead guitar
Brendan O'Brien – producer, mixer

Charts

Weekly charts

Year-end charts

References

Seether songs
2012 singles
Song recordings produced by Brendan O'Brien (record producer)
2010 songs
Wind-up Records singles
Songs written by Troy McLawhorn
Songs written by Dale Stewart
Songs written by Shaun Morgan
Songs written by John Humphrey (drummer)